Corran may refer to:

Given name
Corran Addison, South African canoeist
Corran Horn, fictional character from the Star Wars franchise
Corran McLachlan, scientist and entrepreneur
Coran: character from Voltron

Surname
 Andrew Corran, born 1936, English cricketer and schoolmaster

Places 
 Corran, Loch Hourn, a village in Lochalsh, Scotland
 Corran, Lochaber, a village on Loch Linnhe
 Corran Ferry that plies across Loch Linnhe 
 Corran Narrows, a narrow strait in Loch Linnhe
 Corran, County Cavan, a townland in the parish of Templeport, County Cavan
 Corran, County Armagh, a townland in County Armagh, Northern Ireland
 Corran (barony), County Sligo, Ireland
 Corran Tuathail, a mountain west of Killarney, Ireland

See also
 Corann, an ancient Irish territory (tuath) in northwest Connacht
 Coran (disambiguation)